Mohammad Yaqoob Mir (born 28 May 1957) is an Indian Judge and former Chief Justice of Meghalaya High Court.

Career
Mir was born in 1957 at Rajpora, Pulwama, Kashmir. He passed LL.B. from Kashmir University and practiced as an Advocate since 1981 to 1993. Mir qualified for Higher Judicial Services and was appointed District and Sessions Judge on 27 May 1993. He also served as Special Judge, Anti-Corruption in the State of Jammu and Kashmir. He became the Registrar General of the High Court of Jammu and Kashmir. Mir attended International Conference on Arbitration (ICCA). He was appointed Additional Judge of the Jammu and Kashmir High Court in November 2007. On 1 October 2009 he became permanent Judge of the same High Court. Justice Mir took charge of the Acting Chief Justice of the Jammu and Kashmir High Court from 5 January 2015 to 2 February 2015. On 21 May 2018, he was appointed Chief Justice of Meghalaya High Court.

References

Living people
1957 births
Indian judges
Judges of the Jammu and Kashmir High Court
Chief Justices of the Meghalaya High Court
University of Kashmir alumni
People from Jammu and Kashmir
21st-century Indian judges